Bryan Stanley Harvey (born June 2, 1963) is an American former professional baseball relief pitcher.

Career
Harvey attended Bandys High School in Catawba, North Carolina, and the University of North Carolina at Charlotte (UNC Charlotte).

He led the American League in saves in 1991 with 46. That year, Harvey also became the first pitcher to record 40 saves and 100 strikeouts in one season. He finished second in the 1988 American League Rookie of the Year balloting and was named Rookie Pitcher of the Year by The Sporting News.

Harvey was a member of the inaugural Florida Marlins team that began play in Major League Baseball in 1993.

Harvey's pitching repertoire featured a low-90s fastball and a forkball, delivered overhand with a big shoulder turn.

Family
One of his sons, Hunter Harvey, was drafted by the Baltimore Orioles in 2013 and made his major league debut for them on August 17, 2019. Another son, Kris Harvey, played in the minor leagues for the Pittsburgh Pirates organization.

See also

 List of Major League Baseball annual saves leaders

References

External links

1963 births
Living people
American expatriate baseball players in Canada
American League All-Stars
American League saves champions
Baseball players from Tennessee
Brevard County Manatees players
California Angels players
Charlotte 49ers baseball players
Charlotte Knights players
Edmonton Trappers players
Florida Marlins players
Greenville Braves players
Major League Baseball pitchers
Midland Angels players
National League All-Stars
Palm Springs Angels players
People from Catawba, North Carolina
People from Soddy-Daisy, Tennessee
Quad Cities Angels players